Sir Arthur Trevor Harries (13 June 1892 – 1 July 1959) was a British Indian Judge of High Courts of India. He was the Chief Justice of Patna, Lahore and Calcutta High Court.

Career
Educated at University College of Wales, Aberystwyth and Emmanuel College, Cambridge, Harries was called to the English bar by the Middle Temple in 1922 and practised on the South Wales Circuit until 1934, when he became the puisne judge of Allahabad High Court. He served there four years and was elevated as the Chief Justice of Patna High Court in 1938. He was knighted in 1939.

Upon the retirement of Sir Douglas Young, he became the Chief Justice of Lahore High Court in 1942. In 1946, Harries was transferred to Kolkata and became the Chief Justice of the Calcutta High Court after Sir Harold Derbyshire. He retired from the post in 1952.

References

1892 births
1959 deaths
Knights Bachelor
Chief Justices of the Calcutta High Court
British India judges
Chief Justices of the Lahore High Court
Chief Justices of the Patna High Court
Judges of the Allahabad High Court
Alumni of the University of Wales
Alumni of Emmanuel College, Cambridge
Royal Welch Fusiliers officers
British people in colonial India